Ram Nagina Singh  was an Indian politician. He was elected to the Lok Sabha, the lower house of the Parliament of India from the Ghazipur Distt. (East) cum Ballia Distt. (South-West) constituency of Uttar Pradesh  as a member of the Praja Socialist Party.

References

External links
Official biographical sketch in Parliament of India website

1917 births
Praja Socialist Party politicians
Lok Sabha members from Uttar Pradesh
India MPs 1952–1957
People from Ballia district
Year of death missing